Mehdi Rahimi (born 2 May 1999) is an Iranian footballer who plays as a defender for Juventud de Torremolinos in the Segunda División RFEF.

He made his Iran Pro League debut on 13 October 2017 against Siah Jamegan.

Club career statistics 

Last Update:21 November 2017

References

Sepahan S.C. footballers
Nassaji Mazandaran players
1999 births
Living people
Iranian footballers
Association football central defenders
Association football fullbacks
Footballers at the 2018 Asian Games
Asian Games competitors for Iran